Kooraste  is a village in Kanepi Parish, Põlva County in southeastern Estonia. Physician Hermann Guido von Samson-Himmelstjerna (1809–1868) was born in Kooraste.

References

 

Villages in Põlva County
Kreis Werro